Jennifer Rosales (born September 17, 1978) is a professional golfer from the Philippines, currently playing on the U.S.-based LPGA Tour.

Amateur career
Born in Manila, Rosales won the Philippine Ladies Amateur Golf Championship five times in a row from 1994 to 1998. She attended the University of Southern California in Los Angeles and won the 1998 NCAA Championship as a freshman in 1998. Rosales also won the Golf World/Palmetto Dunes Collegiate Invitational, and was named first team All-American for 1998-1999, her sophomore year with the Trojans.

Professional career

Rosales gained exempt status for the LPGA Tour for the 2000 season by finishing tied for seventh at the LPGA Final Qualifying Tournament in October 1999. She became the first golfer from the Philippines to win on the LPGA Tour at the  Chick-fil-A Charity Championship in 2004. Rosales gained her second win at the first official tournament of the 2005 season, the SBS Open at Turtle Bay in Hawaii.

In 2005, Rosales teamed with Dorothy Delasin to represent the Philippines in the inaugural Women's World Cup of Golf, where they finished second. She played with Ana Larraneta in the 2006 event, and was part of Team Asia at the Lexus Cup in 2005 and 2006.
Rosales and Delasin again represented the Philippines in 2008 at the World Cup, and won by two strokes over the team from Korea.  The duo birdied the last four holes in the final round for 65 (–7) in the fourball (better ball) format, for a 54-hole total of 198 (–18).

For the 2014 season, Rosales earned full status on the LPGA Tour by finishing 68th on the 2013 money list.

Professional wins (3)

LPGA Tour (2)

LPGA Tour playoff record (0–1)

Other (1)
2008 (1) Women's World Cup of Golf (with Dorothy Delasin)

Team appearances
Amateur
Espirito Santo Trophy (representing the Philippines): 1996, 1998

Professional
Lexus Cup (representing Asia team): 2005, 2006 (winners)
World Cup (representing the Philippines): 2005, 2008 (winners)

References

External links

Filipino female golfers
USC Trojans women's golfers
LPGA Tour golfers
Asian Games medalists in golf
Asian Games bronze medalists for the Philippines
Golfers at the 1994 Asian Games
Golfers at the 1998 Asian Games
Medalists at the 1998 Asian Games
Sportspeople from Manila
People from the San Gabriel Valley
1978 births
Living people